Cosmosoma myrodora, the scarlet-bodied wasp moth, is a moth of the subfamily Arctiinae. It was described by Harrison Gray Dyar Jr. in 1907. It is found in the United States in Florida and from South Carolina to Texas. The habitat consists of coastal plains.

The wingspan is 30–35 mm. Adults have a bright red body and transparent wings. There is a metallic blue middorsal line on the abdomen, which broadens to cover the tip. The veins and margins of the forewings and hindwings are black. Adults are on wing from March to December. An adult male extracts toxic chemicals from Eupatorium capillifolium and showers these toxins over the female prior to mating.

The larvae feed on Mikania scandens.

References

External links
Cosmosoma myrodora on the UF / IFAS Featured Creatures website.

myrodora
Moths described in 1907